The 1990 World Rowing Championships were World Rowing Championships that were held from 31 October to 4 November 1990 at Lake Barrington in Tasmania, Australia.

German teams
A month prior to the World Championships, Germany completed the political process of reunification of the eastern and western parts of the country. This was done at great speed, and organisational changes at the sports level took longer, with the German rowing federations due to merge by the end of 1990. FISA confirmed to the East German rowing federation that their rowers could participate as an separate team to West Germany, but without the designation of East Germany (GDR). There were no problems with medal ceremonies, as national anthems were not played nor national flags raised based on a decision made in 1955.

Medal summary

Men's events

Women's events

Medal table

References

Rowing competitions in Australia
World Rowing Championships
World Rowing Championships
World Rowing Championships
Rowing Championships
Sports competitions in Tasmania
Rowing
Rowing